Silvio Fauner (born 1 November 1968 in San Pietro di Cadore, Province of Belluno) is an Italian former cross-country skier who competed from 1988 to 2006. His best known victory was part of the 4 × 10 km relay team that upset Norway at the 1994 Winter Olympics in Lillehammer. He also won four other medals at the Winter Olympics with silvers in the 4 × 10 km relay (1992, 1998) and bronzes in the 15 km (1994) and 30 km (1998).

Biography
Fauner also won six medals at the Nordic skiing World Championships, including 1 gold (50 km: 1995), 2 silvers (10 km + 15 km combined pursuit: 1995, 4 × 10 km relay: 1993), and 3 bronzes (4 × 10 km relay: 1995, 1997, 1999).

At the Opening Ceremony for the 2006 Winter Olympics in Turin on February 10, he and his 4 × 10 km relay teammates (Maurilio De Zolt, Marco Albarello, and Giorgio Vanzetta) who won the gold at the 1994 Winter Olympics in Lillehammer, were among the last carriers of the Olympic torch before it was lit by fellow Italian cross-country skier Stefania Belmondo.

In May 2007, Fauner was named the head coach of the Italian national cross-country ski team, replacing his former ski-teammate Marco Albarello.

Doping allegations

The Swedish investigative television show Uppdrag granskning claimed that Fauner had an exceptionally high hemoglobin level prior to a World Cup in Lahti in 1997. According to sources quoted in the documentary, Fauner had tested 19.2 g/dL. The test result was confirmed and signed by International Ski Federation (FIS) official Bengt-Erik Bengtsson. Currently the allowed limit to compete in official FIS competition is 17.0 g/dL. According to Bengt Saltin, former chairman of FIS medical committee, such an hemoglobin value is not possible to achieve without banned substances or blood doping.

Cross-country skiing results
All results are sourced from the International Ski Federation (FIS).

Olympic Games
 5 medals – (1, gold, 2 silver, 2 bronze)

World Championships
 7 medals – (1 gold, 2 silver, 4 bronze)

World Cup

Season standings

Individual podiums
3 victories 
19 podiums

Team podiums

 6 victories – (5 , 1 )
 23 podiums – (21 , 2 )

Note:  Until the 1999 World Championships and the 1994 Winter Olympics, World Championship and Olympic races were included in the World Cup scoring system.

References

External links
 
 

1968 births
Living people
People from San Pietro di Cadore
Italian male cross-country skiers
Cross-country skiers at the 1992 Winter Olympics
Cross-country skiers at the 1994 Winter Olympics
Cross-country skiers at the 1998 Winter Olympics
Cross-country skiers at the 2002 Winter Olympics
Cross-country skiing coaches
Olympic medalists in cross-country skiing
Cross-country skiers of Centro Sportivo Carabinieri
FIS Nordic World Ski Championships medalists in cross-country skiing
Medalists at the 1998 Winter Olympics
Medalists at the 1994 Winter Olympics
Medalists at the 1992 Winter Olympics
Olympic gold medalists for Italy
Olympic silver medalists for Italy
Olympic bronze medalists for Italy
Olympic cross-country skiers of Italy
Sportspeople from the Province of Belluno